Council Rock High School South is a public high school located in Holland, Bucks County, Pennsylvania. It is operated by the Council Rock School District.

The school was built in 2002 in order to address the overpopulation at what was then the district's only high school, now known as Council Rock High School North. South currently serves grades 9-12 and houses over 2000 students.

The school colors are blue, white, and gold, and the sports teams are known as The Golden Hawks.

Notable alumni

 Greg Cochrane - retired professional soccer player
 Jenn McAllister - YouTube personality
 Justin Pugh - professional football player

References

External links
 

Public high schools in Pennsylvania
Educational institutions established in 2002
Schools in Bucks County, Pennsylvania
School buildings completed in 2002
2002 establishments in Pennsylvania